Ochieng is an African name. People with this name include:

Bernard Ochieng, Kenyan footballer
Collins Ochieng (born 1987), Kenyan footballer
Daudi Ochieng (1925–1966), Ugandan politician
David Ochieng (born 1992), Kenyan footballer
Duncan Ochieng (born 1978), Kenyan footballer
Edgar Ochieng (born 1977), Kenyan footballer
Enosh Ochieng (born 1991), Kenyan footballer
Eric Ochieng, Kenyan footballer
Erick Ochieng(born 1987), British boxer
Eugene Ochieng (born 1993), Kenyan cricketer
Felix 'Toti' Ochieng, Kenyan rugby coach
Frazier Ochieng (born 1975), Kenyan footballer
Francis Ochieng (born 1982), Kenyan footballer
Henry Ochieng (born 1998), Kenyan footballer
Kennedy Ochieng (born 1971), Kenyan sprinter
Kevin Ochieng (born 1985), Kenyan footballer
Mark Ochieng, Australian soccer player
Ovella Ochieng (born 1999), Kenyan footballer
Pascal Ochieng (born 1986), Kenyan footballer
Pius Ochieng (born 1960), Kenyan weightlifter
Raymond Ochieng (born 1977), Kenyan boxer
Tony Harvard Ochieng (born 2002),Kenyan academic 
Victor Ochieng (born 1991), Kenyan footballer
Washington Yotto Ochieng, Kenyan academic
Willis Ochieng (born 1981), Kenyan footballer